Margavar Rural District is in Silvaneh District of Urmia County, West Azerbaijan province, Iran. At the National Census of 2006, its population was 34,862 in 6,012 households. There were 37,170 inhabitants in 8,364 households at the following census of 2011. At the most recent census of 2016, the population of the rural district was 40,174 in 9,602 households. The largest of its 54 villages was Dizaj, with 4,907 people.

According to Harry P. Packard of the Board of Foreign Missions of the Presbyterian Church, the districts of Targawar, Mergawar, and Dasht were destroyed by Turks and Kurds during the Assyrian genocide in events that gave rise to the Assyrian independence movement. Few Assyrians remain in Margavar and the district is mostly populated by Kurds.

See also 

 Emirate of Bradost

References 

Urmia County

Rural Districts of West Azerbaijan Province

Populated places in West Azerbaijan Province

Populated places in Urmia County

Places of the Assyrian genocide

Kurdish settlements in West Azerbaijan Province